Oleg Butković (born 4 May 1979) is a Croatian politician serving as Minister of Maritime Affairs, Transport and Infrastructure since 2016. He assumed the position in the cabinet of Tihomir Orešković and continued to hold the position in the first and second cabinet of Andrej Plenković. He is also serving as one of deputy prime ministers, assuming office following Zdravko Marić's 2022 resignation.

See also 
Cabinet of Andrej Plenković I
Cabinet of Andrej Plenković II

References 

Living people
1979 births
Politicians from Rijeka
21st-century Croatian politicians
Government ministers of Croatia
University of Rijeka alumni